García Felipe de Legazpi y Velasco Altamirano y Albornoz (February 15, 1643 – March 6, 1706) was a Roman Catholic prelate who served as the Bishop of Tlaxcala (1704–1706), Bishop of Michoacán (1701–1704), and Bishop of Durango (1691–1701).

Biography
García Felipe de Legazpi y Velasco Altamirano y Albornoz was born in Mexico. On June 19, 1691, he was selected by the King of Spain and confirmed by Pope Alexander VIII as Bishop of Durango. On December 7, 1692, he was consecrated bishop by Francisco de Aguiar y Seijas y Ulloa, Archbishop of México. On August 8, 1701, he was selected by the King of Spain and confirmed by Pope Pope Clement XI as Bishop of Michoacán; he was installed on March 4, 1703. On January 14, he was selected by the King of Spain and confirmed by Pope Clement XI as Bishop of Tlaxcala; he was installed on May 30, 1704. He served as Bishop of Tlaxcala until his death on March 6, 1706.

While bishop, he was the principal consecrator of Diego de Gorospe y Irala, Bishop of Nueva Segovia (1702), and Manuel de Escalante Colombres y Mendoza, Bishop of Durango (1703).

References

External links and additional sources
 (for Chronology of Bishops) 
 (for Chronology of Bishops) 
 (for Chronology of Bishops) 
 (for Chronology of Bishops) 
 (for Chronology of Bishops) 
 (for Chronology of Bishops) 

1643 births
1706 deaths
Bishops appointed by Pope Alexander VIII
Bishops appointed by Pope Clement XI